The women's 200 metres event at the 2002 African Championships in Athletics was held in Radès, Tunisia on August 9–10.

Medalists

Results

Heats
Wind:Heat 1: +1.5 m/s, Heat 2: +3.3 m/s, Heat 3: +1.5 m/s

Final
Wind: +2.2 m/s

References

2002 African Championships in Athletics
200 metres at the African Championships in Athletics
2002 in women's athletics